The Silver Globe is the sixth studio album by English musician Jane Weaver, released on 20 October 2014 by Finders Keepers.

Track listing

References

External links
 

2014 albums
Albums recorded at Electro-Vox Recording Studios
Jane Weaver albums